Jakkit Niyomsuk (born June 8, 1994) is a Thai professional footballer who currently plays for Nakhon Si United in the Thai League 2.

References

External links
 
 

1994 births
Living people
Jakkit Niyomsuk
Jakkit Niyomsuk
Association football forwards
Jakkit Niyomsuk
Jakkit Niyomsuk
Nakhon Si United F.C. players